"Return to New York " is the first episode of the fourth series of the 1990s British comedy television series Jeeves and Wooster.

In the US, it was aired as the first episode of the third series of Jeeves and Wooster on Masterpiece Theatre, on 10 October 1993. "Pearls Mean Tears" aired as the first episode of the fourth series instead.

Background 
Adapted from "The Spot of Art" (collected in Very Good, Jeeves), "The Delayed Exit of Claude and Eustace" (collected in The Inimitable Jeeves), and "Fixing it for Freddie" (collected in Carry On, Jeeves).

Cast
 Bertie Wooster – Hugh Laurie
 Jeeves – Stephen Fry
 Aunt Agatha  – Elizabeth Spriggs
 Tuppy Glossop – Robert Daws
 Eustace Wooster – Joss Brook
 Claude Wooster – Jeremy Brook
 Gwladys Pendlebury – Deirdre Strath
 Elizabeth Vickers – Briony Glassco
 Lucius Pim – Marcus D'Amico
 Slingsby – Harry Ditson
 Mrs Slingsby – Marcia Layton
 Liftman Coneybear – Joseph Mydell
 May Prysock – Devon Scott

Plot
Aunt Agatha wants to pack her wayward nephews Claude and Eustace Wooster off to Africa but both have fallen in love with a singer at a nightclub Bertie took them to the night before, and sneak back from the docks to Bertie's place to pursue her. Bertie wants to marry the portrait painter Gwladys Pendlebury. Aunt Agatha dislikes her portrait painting by Gwladys Pendlebury. Her portrait painting is used by the soup manufacturer Slingsby's Superb Soup as "Granny's Favorite" SLINGSBY'S  Olde Englyshe Cock-a-Leekie Soup. Bertie's efforts to help Tuppy end in a disaster and Aunt Agatha ends up as a laughing stock, and looking for the cause, blames Bertie.

See also
 List of Jeeves and Wooster characters

References

External links

Jeeves and Wooster episodes
1993 British television episodes
Television episodes set in New York City